ZR Speaker Lab  is a small company based in Slovenia, Europe. It is specialized in production of only high-end, handmade speakers and audio devices. The production is limited.

History
The company was founded in 1983 by Zvone Raspor. He has more than 30 years of experience in audio field. Besides being a speaker constructor and designer, Zvone is also an artist.

Philosophy and availability
The philosophy of the firm is to implement the knowledge gained from the arts into the science of speakers. ZR Speaker Lab products are currently distributed in many countries worldwide, including Canada, the United States of America, Thailand, South Korea, Indonesia and Japan.

Cooperation with Ground Zero Audio
Since 2007, ZR Speaker Lab has been cooperating with Ground Zero. Four speakers in Plutonium-Reference line were developed, which are Plutonium GZPW Reference 18, Plutonium GZPM Reference 100, Plutonium GZPK Reference 180 and Plutonium GZPT Reference 25.

References

External links
Official Website
Official Facebook
Phantom Audio Site

Audio equipment manufacturers of Slovenia
Companies established in 1983
Loudspeaker manufacturers
Slovenian brands